Raquel Atawo and Abigail Spears were the defending champions, but chose not to compete together. Atawo played alongside Chan Hao-ching, but lost in the first round to Jennifer Brady and Madison Keys. Spears teamed up with Coco Vandeweghe and successfully defended her title, defeating Alizé Cornet and Alicja Rosolska in the final, 6–2, 6–3.

Seeds

Draw

External links
 Main draw

Bank of the West Classic - Doubles
Silicon Valley Classic